Reality refers to the state of things as they exist, as opposed to how they could possibly exist.

Reality may also refer to:

Films and television
 Reality (2012 film), a 2012 Italian film directed by Matteo Garrone
 Reality (2014 film), a 2014 French-Belgian film directed by Quentin Dupieux

Music
 Reality (David Bowie album), 2003
 "Reality" (David Bowie song)
 Reality (Dream album), 2003
 Reality (Monk Montgomery album), 1974
 Reality (Smooth album), 1998
 Reality (James Brown album), 1974
 "Reality" (James Brown song), 1975
 Reality (Second Hand album), 1968
 Reality (Infinite EP), 2015
 Reality (Real Estate EP), 2009
 Reality (Tackhead song), 1988
 "Reality" (Kenny Chesney song), 2011
 "Reality" (Richard Sanderson song), 1980
 "Reality" (Lost Frequencies song), 2015
 "Reality" (Dream song), 2000
 "Reality", a song by the Christian group The Newsboys on their album Take Me To Your Leader
 "Reality", a song by Staind from 14 Shades of Grey
 "R.E.A.L.I.T.Y.", a song by KRS-One from the 1995 album KRS-One, the title an acronym standing for "Rhymes Equal Actual Life In The Youth"
 Reality (Ahead of Schedule) EP, by the Red Paintings
 Ytilaer, 2022 album by Bill Callahan

Others
 Real life, the state of existence outside of online or artificial interactions
 Reality (database) by Microdata Corporation, now Northgate Information Solutions
 Reality Winner, American whistleblower

See also
 Realiti (disambiguation)
 Real World (disambiguation)
 Reality television